Dypsis boiviniana is a species of palm tree. It is endemic to Madagascar. Its common name is talanoka.

This plant grows in rainforests. There are fewer than 100 mature individuals estimated to remain.

References

boiviniana
Endemic flora of Madagascar
Endangered plants
Taxonomy articles created by Polbot
Taxa named by Henri Ernest Baillon
Flora of the Madagascar lowland forests